The 48th Guldbagge Awards ceremony, presented by the Swedish Film Institute, honored the best Swedish films of 2012 and took place January 21, 2013, at Cirkus in Stockholm. During the ceremony, the jury presented Guldbagge Awards (commonly referred to as Bagge) in 19 categories. The ceremony was televised in the Sweden by SVT, with actress and comedian Babben Larsson hosting the show.

Eat Sleep Die won four awards including Best Film and Best Director for Gabriela Pichler. Call Girl also won four awards, all in the technical categories. Other winners included Palme and Avalon with two awards each, and The Last Sentence, Searching for Sugar Man, Dance Music Now, Amour, Easy Money II: Hard to Kill and Isdraken with one.

The jury 
Through discussions the jury appoints the winners of the Guldbagge Award among the three nominees in all price categories, except for the Honorary Award which is appointed directly by the Swedish Film Institute's board. The jury consisted this year of Jannike Åhlund (chairman), Anna Carlson, (actress and chairman of Teaterförbundet), Bengt Forslund (producer and writer), Anna Croneman (producer), Klaus Härö (director), Farnaz Arbabi (director and playwright), Matti Bye (musician and composer), Sylvia Ingemarsdotter (film editor) and Marcus Lindeen (director and playwright).

Winner and nominees 
The nominees for the 48th Guldbagge Awards were announced on January 3, 2013 in Stockholm, by the Swedish Film Institute.

Films with the most nominations were Call Girl with eleven, followed by The Last Sentence and Searching for Sugar Man with six. The winners were announced during the awards ceremony on January 21, 2013.

Awards 

Winners are listed first and highlighted in 'boldface.

 Multiple nominations and awards 

The following films received one or multiple nominations:
 Eleven: Call Girl Six: The Last Sentence and Searching for Sugar Man Five: Eat Sleep Die Four: Avalon and Easy Money II: Hard to Kill Three: Palme Two: Bitchkram and Hamilton – I nationens intresse One: Katinkas kalas, Lycka till och ta hand om varandra, Mammas pojkar, Pojktanten, El Médico – the Cubaton Story, Isdraken, Once Upon a Time in Phuket and Sune i Grekland - All inclusiveThe following four films received multiple awards:
 Four: Call Girl and Eat Sleep Die Two: Palme and Avalon''

References

External links 

 

2013 in Swedish cinema
2012 film awards
Guldbagge Awards ceremonies
2010s in Stockholm
January 2013 events in Europe